The Oued Meraldene or Oued Merabtene, also called Oued Bourdine, is a river of Algeria located in Kabylia within the framework of the Province of Boumerdès.

Presentation
The Meraldène stream is one of the main tributaries of the Boumerdès River which is a river that finds its mouth in the Mediterranean Sea.

At an altitude of 590 meters above sea level near the villages of Beni Khelifa and Azela, Oued Meraldene is born to take its course on a river bed that juts out into the current town of Thénia.

This area is rich in water resources thus feeds the Oued which then traces its route between the villages of Tabrahimt, Meraldene, Gueddara, Soumâa, Tizouighine before reaching the plateau of the village Louz.

Mouth
The Meraldene River rises in flood especially during the winter and the Oued becomes impassable and dangerous, and causes floods that spread to the village of Louz beyond which it finds its mouth with the Boumerdès River which springs also from the heights of Beni Amrane and then flows into the Mediterranean.

Dam

Given the profusion of water flowing through Oued Meraldene, a hydraulic dam was built to store part of its flowing water.

The Meraldene Dam was built between 1911 and 1913 to provide answers to economic questions related to the continuous supply of drinking water, often so difficult to achieve.

This is how on 26 February 1913, this important dam was completed and inaugurated and on its final acceptance.

It is a hydraulic structure 14 meters high by 70 meters wide, blocking the Meraldene Valley, and which can hold a water volume of 30,000 cubic meters.

This stored water was intended for supplying machine depots and railway workshops in the city of Thénia concurrently with the direct intake 300 meters upstream.

The design of this important hydraulic structure made it possible to collect sufficient water for the industrial needs of the Thénia region.

Its final acceptance was made with the dam full, with all the conditions that were met such as the connection of electricity to operate its pumps.

Gallery

See also
 List of rivers of Algeria
 Meraldene Dam
 Khachna Massif

External links

References

Rivers of Algeria
Boumerdès Province